Honey Brown (born 1972) is an Australian novelist who grew up in Campbell Town, Tasmania. She attended Campbell Town High School and Launceston College before moving to Victoria. In 2009 she was involved in a farming accident which left her partially paralysed and unable to walk. She now lives in Gippsland, Victoria, with her husband and two children.

Her first novel, Red Queen, was published by Penguin in 2008 and won the Aurealis Award for best horror novel in 2009.  With her subsequent novels she was longlisted for the Miles Franklin Award in 2011 for The Good Daughter, and she won the Davitt Award in 2014 for Dark Horse.

Bibliography

Novels

 Red Queen (2008)
 The Good Daughter (2010)
 After the Darkness (2012)
 Dark Horse (2013)
 Through the Cracks (2014)
Six Degrees: The power of attraction connects us all (2015)

Awards and nominations

 2009 winner Aurealis Award for best horror novel – Red Queen
 2009 highly commended The Fellowship of Australian Writers Victoria Inc. National Literary Awards – FAW Christina Stead Award – Red Queen
 2009 finalist Australian Shadows Award – Long Fiction – Red Queen
 2011 longlisted Miles Franklin Literary Award – The Good Daughter
 2011 shortlisted Barbara Jefferis Award – The Good Daughter
 2013 longlisted Davitt Award – Best Adult Crime Novel – After the Darkness
 2014 winner Davitt Award – Best Adult Crime Novel – Dark Horse
 2015 shortlisted Davitt Award – Best Adult Crime Novel – Through the Cracks

References

1972 births
Living people
Australian women novelists
21st-century Australian novelists
21st-century Australian women writers
Writers from Tasmania
Writers from Victoria (Australia)
Australian horror writers
Women horror writers
Australian crime writers
Women mystery writers